Deceptive Practice: The Mysteries and Mentors of Ricky Jay is an American 2012 documentary film about the magician Ricky Jay, and is directed by Molly Bernstein.

Summary
The film offers perspective into how Jay's mentors (and fellow magical mentors) including Cardini, Dai Vernon and Charlie Miller affected his development as a magician.

External links

2012 films
American documentary films
Documentary films about entertainers
2012 documentary films
Films about magic and magicians
2010s English-language films
2010s American films